Ahn Ji-hwan (born July 24, 1969) is a South Korean voice actor, actor and television and radio presenter who joined Munhwa Broadcasting Corporation's Voice Acting Division in 1993 and debuted with his role as Prince Dandarn (known as Prince Omar in South Korea) on the Korean dub of Time Travel Tondekeman.

Since the early 2000s, Ahn has narrated several entertaining shows at Seoul Broadcasting System, including Animal Farm, The Music Trend, and Star King. In June 2012, he made his stage debut, performing the part of Edna Turnblad in a South Korean musical Hairspray based on a 1988 film under the same title.

Ahn has become famous for his cover of Johnny Depp on the Korean dub of Pirates of the Caribbean: The Curse of the Black Pearl, for his role as Det. Danny Messer on the Korean dub of CSI: NY, and for his narration of The Knee-Drop Guru on the South Korean talk show Golden Fishery.

Career

Voice acting

TV animation dubbing 
 Bomberman B-Daman Bakugaiden Victory (빅토리 구슬동자, SBS)
 Black Bomber (later)
 Fantomcat (무적 고양이 팬텀, MBC)
 Fantomcat
 Flower Witch Mary Bell (꽃의 천사 메리벨, MBC)
 Takuro
 Future GPX Cyber Formula (신세기 사이버 포뮬러, SBS)
 Bleed Kaga
 Galaxy Express 999 (은하철도 999, MBC)
 Count Mecha
 Hamtaro (방가방가 햄토리, SBS)
 Dexter (An-gyeong on the Korean TV edition)
 Iron Man #28 FX (철인 28호 FX, MBC)
 Franken
 Miracle Girls (요술소녀, MBC)
 Chris Kubrick (Woo Jeong-soo on the Korean TV edition)
 Olympus Guardian (그리스 로마 신화: 올림포스 가디언, SBS)
 Hercules
 The Prince of Tennis (테니스의 왕자, SBS)
 Kunimitsu Tezuka (Dok-go Si-hyeong on the Korean TV edition)
 Red Baron (레드 바론, MBC)
 Kômei Ryû (Je-gal Ryang on the Korean TV edition)
 Narrator
 Rolling Stars (롤링 스타즈, KBS)
 Narrator
 Slam Dunk (슬램덩크, SBS)
 Akira Sendoh (Yoon Dae-hyeop on the Korean TV edition)
 Kiminobu Kogure (Kwon Jun-ho on the Korean TV edition)
 Narrator
 Time Travel Tondekeman (시간 탐험대, MBC)
 Prince Dandarn (Prince Omar on the Korean TV edition)

Animated movie dubbing

1990s

2010s

Film dubbing 
 A 
 All the Pretty Horses (올 더 프리티 호스, MBC)
 Matt Damon as John Grady Cole
 Armageddon (아마겟돈, SBS)
 Ben Affleck as A. J. Frost

 B 
 Bad Boys II (나쁜 녀석들 2, MBC)
 Martin Lawrence as Detective Marcus Burnett
 Big Daddy (빅 대디, MBC)
 Adam Sandler as Sonny Koufax

 C 
 A Chinese Ghost Story (천녀유혼, MBC)
 Leslie Cheung as Ning Choi-san
 A Chinese Ghost Story Part II (천녀유혼 2, MBC)
 Leslie Cheung as Ning Choi-san
 Click (클릭, MBC)
 Adam Sandler as Michael Newman
 Cold Mountain (콜드 마운틴, MBC)
 Jude Law as W.P. Inman
 Con Air (콘 에어, MBC)
 John Cusack as US Marshal Vince Larkin
 Contact (컨택트, SBS)
 Matthew McConaughey as Palmer Joss

 D 
 Double Team (더블 팀, MBC)
 Jean-Claude Van Damme as Jack Paul Quinn

 E 
 Enemy at the Gates (에너미 앳 더 게이트, MBC)
 Jude Law as Vassili Zaitsev

 H 
 Heat (히트, MBC)
 Val Kilmer as Chris Shiherlis
 Hero (영웅, MBC)
 Jet Li as Nameless
 House of Flying Daggers (연인, MBC)
 Andy Lau as Liu

 I 
 Inner Senses (이도공간, SBS)
 Leslie Cheung as Jim Law
 The Italian Job (이탈리안 잡, MBC)
 Edward Norton as Steve

 L 
 The Lord of the Rings (반지의 제왕: 반지 원정대, SBS)
 Viggo Mortensen as Aragorn
 M 
 Meltdown (이연걸의 탈출, MBC)
 Jet Li as Kit Li
 Mission: Impossible 2 (미션 임파서블 2, MBC)
 Tom Cruise as Ethan Hunt

 N 
 Nick of Time (닉 오브 타임, MBC)
 Johnny Depp as Gene Watson

 P 
 Pirates of the Caribbean: The Curse of the Black Pearl (캐리비안의 해적: 블랙 펄의 저주, MBC)
 Johnny Depp as Captain Jack Sparrow

 R 
 Red Cliff (적벽대전, MBC)
 Tony Leung as Zhou Yu
 Rogue Trader (겜블, MBC)
 Ewan McGregor as Nick Leeson
 The Rundown (웰컴 투 더 정글, MBC)
 Dwayne Johnson as Beck

 S 
 Samurai Fiction (사무라이 픽션, MBC)
 Tomoyasu Hotei as Rannosuke Kazamatsuri
 Sky Captain and the World of Tomorrow (월드 오브 투모로우, MBC)
 Jude Law as Sky Captain
 Snatch (스내치, MBC)
 Brad Pitt as Mickey O'Neil
 Star Wars (스타 워즈, MBC)
 Ewan McGregor as Obi-Wan Kenobi
 Mark Hamill as Luke Skywalker

 T 
 The Thomas Crown Affair (토마스 크라운 어페어, MBC)
 Pierce Brosnan as Thomas Crown
 Top Gun (탑 건, SBS)
 Tom Cruise as LT Pete "Maverick" Mitchell

 V 
 Vanilla Sky (바닐라 스카이, MBC)
 Tom Cruise as David Aames

 Y 
 You Don't Mess with the Zohan (조한, MBC)
 Adam Sandler as Zohan Dvir/Scrappy Coco

Foreign TV show dubbing 
 24 (24, MBC)
 Kiefer Sutherland as Jack Bauer
 Band of Brothers (밴드 오브 브라더스, MBC)
 Matthew Settle as Ronald Speirs
 Buffy the Vampire Slayer (버피와 뱀파이어, MBC)
 Nicholas Brendon as Xander Harris
 The Client (존 그리셤의 의뢰인, MBC)
 David Barry Gray as Clint McGuire
 CSI: NY (CSI NY, MBC)
 Carmine Giovinazzo as Det. Danny Messer
 The Fugitive (도망자, MBC)
 Tim Daly as Richard Kimble
 Heroes (히어로즈, SBS)
 Adrian Pasdar as Nathan Petrelli
 Ripley's Believe It or Not! (리플리의 믿거나 말거나, MBC)
 Dean Cain as Himself
 Smallville (스몰빌, MBC)
 Michael Rosenbaum as Lex Luthor

Narrations 
 5th Republic (제5공화국, MBC)
 Animal Farm (TV 동물농장, SBS)
 Crisis Escape No. 1 (위기탈출 넘버원, KBS)
 Global Report (지구촌 리포트, MBC)
 Golden Fishery (황금어장, MBC)
 Narrator of the segment "The Knee-Drop Guru (무릎팍 도사)"
 January 3, 2007 - October 12, 2011 (aired Wednesdays, first run until the segment ended due to the temporary retirement of Kang Ho-dong)
 November 29, 2012 - August 22, 2013 (aired Thursdays, second run after the segment was revamped as an independent show)
 Live Show: Friday Wide (생방송 금요와이드, MBC)
 Narrator of the segment "Appetizing Trips with Sayuri Fujita (사유리의 식탐여행)"
 Martian Virus (화성인 바이러스, tvN)
 MBC News Desk (MBC 뉴스데스크, MBC)
 News presenter
 The Music Trend (SBS 인기가요, previously SBS Popular Song, SBS)
 Stage presenter
 Our Sunday Night (일요일 일요일 밤에, previously Sunday Sunday Night, MBC)
 Narrator of the segment "Love House"
 Section TV Entertainment Telecommunications (섹션 TV 연예통신, MBC)
 News presenter
 Star King (놀라운 대회! 스타킹, SBS)

TV appearances

1990s

2000s

2010s

Radio appearances

2000s

2010s

Stage appearance

Awards

Korean Broadcasting Awards

Korean Broadcasting Producer Awards

MBC Drama Awards

SBS Awards

See also 
 Munhwa Broadcasting Corporation
 MBC Voice Acting Division

References

External links 
 Ahn Ji-hwan's blog on MBC Voice 
 FnRodz: The official fan club of Ahn Ji-hwan 
 

1969 births
Living people
Male actors from Seoul
People from Seoul
South Korean male voice actors